高雄 may refer to:

 Kaohsiung, a city in Taiwan
 Kaohsiung County, a former county in Taiwan
 Port of Kaohsiung
 Kaohsiung metropolitan area
 Takao Prefecture, a prefecture of Taiwan during the Japanese era
 Takao, a place within Ukyō-ku, Kyoto
 Mount Takao, a mountain in Kyoto, Japan, location of the Jingo-ji temple
 Japanese ship Takao, a list of Japanese ships
 Eddy Ko, a Hong Kong film star

See also
 Takao (disambiguation)